Tirrell may refer to:

People

Surname 
Albert Tirrell (1824–1880), man acquitted of murder by the sleepwalking defense
Alf Tirrell (1894–1944), English footballer
Charles Q. Tirrell (1844–1910), American politician
David A. Tirrell (born 1953), American chemist
Lynne Tirrell, American philosopher
Matthew Tirrell (born 1950), American chemical engineer

Given name
Tirrell Greene (born 1972), American football offensive lineman

Places 
Tirrell Mountain, a mountain in Adirondack Mountains of New York